Soloist  may refer to:
Soloist (ballet), a rank within a ballet company above corps de ballet but below principal dancer
Soloist (card player), a player who plays a solo against two or more others in a card game
Solo (music), a person playing music or singing alone
Solo (dance), a dancer who dances alone
In mountaineering, someone who specializes in solo climbing
The Soloist, a 2009 American drama film.
Jackson Soloist, a guitar model by Jackson Guitars
Rockman Soloist, a guitar amplifier part of the Rockman series

See also
Solo (disambiguation)
Cantor (disambiguation)